Aïn Nouïssy is a town and commune in Mostaganem Province, Algeria. It is the capital of Aïn Nouïssy District. According to the 1998 census it has a population of 11,389.

References

Communes of Mostaganem Province